Suckerins are a type of block copolymer protein that forms the teeth of sucker rings and beaks of cephalopods.  These biopolymers form exhibit high elastic modulus and thermoplastic behavior.

Properties
Suckerin proteins have a size range from 5-60kDA with an isoelectric point of pl 7–10.

Applications
Suckerin has a structure similar to spider silk.  In the future it could be used to make medical tools, specialty bandages, sutures and artificial ligaments.  Additionally, it could be used for commercial and industrial products such as well as body armor, parachutes, sails and airplane components.

References 

Structural proteins
Molluscan proteins